Norman Alasdair Macleod (6 December 1927, in Glasgow – 2 October 1991) was a Scottish chess player and chess composer. He gained title Grandmaster of the FIDE for Chess Composition in 1993.

References

 The Chessboard Adventures of Norman Macleod, Feenschach-Phenix 1997. Edited by John Rice.

External links

 https://web.archive.org/web/20110727183133/http://www.chessscotland.com/history/biographies/macleod_na.htm
 Macleod's Problems on PDB server

1927 births
1991 deaths
Grandmasters for chess composition
Scottish chess players
20th-century chess players